Corbet Page Stewart  (1896–1962) was a Scottish biochemist and academic author.

Life
He was born in Durham in 1896 the son of Joseph Walton Stewart and his wife, Hannah Bousfield.

He studied biochemistry at the University of Edinburgh, and then began lecturing there.

In 1931 he was elected a Fellow of the Royal Society of Edinburgh. His proposers were George Barger, James Lorrain Smith, David Murray Lyon and Sir David Wilkie. He resigned in 1938.

He died in 1962.

Family

In 1919 he married Ethel May Kemp (b.1898).

Publications

The Revival of the Religoius Mendicant Orders
Clinical Chemistry in Practical Medicine (1962)
Advances in Clinical Chemistry (1970)

References

1896 births
1962 deaths
People from Durham, England
Alumni of the University of Edinburgh
Academics of the University of Edinburgh
Fellows of the Royal Society of Edinburgh
Scottish biochemists
Fellows of the Society of Antiquaries of Scotland
20th-century antiquarians